Geoffrey William Richard Hugh FitzClarence, 5th Earl of Munster, KBE, PC (17 February 1906 – 26 August 1975) was a British peer and Conservative politician.

Background
Munster was the son of Major the Honourable Harold Edward FitzClarence (seventh son of William FitzClarence, 2nd Earl of Munster and Wilhelmina FitzClarence, Countess of Munster) and his wife, Frances Isabel Eleanor (née Keppel) (1874–1951), whose paternal grandfather, Rev. William Arnold Walpole Keppel, was a male-line great-grandson of Willem van Keppel, 2nd Earl of Albemarle.

Geoffrey Munster was educated at Charterhouse School.

Political career
Munster succeeded his uncle as fifth Earl of Munster in 1928 and took his seat on the Conservative benches in the House of Lords. In 1934, he was appointed a Lord-in-waiting (government whip in the House of Lords) in the National Government of Ramsay MacDonald, a post he held until 1938, the last three years under the premiership firstly of Stanley Baldwin and secondly of Neville Chamberlain. In June 1938, Chamberlain appointed Munster Paymaster-General, an office he held until February 1939, when he was made Under-Secretary of State for War. He remained in this position until September 1939.

Munster returned to the government in January 1943 when Winston Churchill appointed him Parliamentary Secretary for India and Burma, a post he held until October 1944, and then served as Under-Secretary of State for the Home Department until July 1945 when Labour came to power. When Churchill became Prime Minister for a second time in 1951, Munster was appointed Under-Secretary of State for the Colonies, an office he retained until 1954, and was then Minister without Portfolio between 1954 and 1957. In 1954, he was admitted to the Privy Council.

Honours
Apart from his political career, Lord Munster was also Lord Lieutenant of Surrey from 1957 to 1973.  In 1957 he was made a Knight Commander of the Order of the British Empire (KBE)

Personal life

Lord Munster married Hilary Wilson in 1928. Lord Munster died in August 1975, aged 69, and was succeeded in his titles by his second cousin, Edward Charles FitzClarence, 6th Earl of Munster.

Hilary FitzClarence, Countess of Munster, was an accomplished musician who founded the Countess of Munster Musical Trust in 1958. She died in 1979 at Sandhills, Bletchingley. Her estate was sworn for probate as £799,392. The house which had at the time more than 10 acres was built in 1893 by Mervyn Macartney in free Tudor style and is protected under UK law with Grade II listing.

Notes

References

External links

1906 births
1975 deaths
Conservative Party (UK) Baronesses- and Lords-in-Waiting
5
English people of Dutch descent
Geoffrey FitzClarence, 5th Earl of Munster
Foreign Office personnel of World War II
Knights Commander of the Order of the British Empire
Lord-Lieutenants of Surrey
Members of London County Council
Members of the Privy Council of the United Kingdom
Ministers in the Chamberlain peacetime government, 1937–1939
Ministers in the Churchill caretaker government, 1945
Ministers in the Churchill wartime government, 1940–1945
Ministers in the Eden government, 1955–1957
Ministers in the Macmillan and Douglas-Home governments, 1957–1964
Ministers in the third Churchill government, 1951–1955
People educated at Charterhouse School
Schuyler family
War Office personnel in World War II